The Meeting is a live album by American saxophonist Jackie McLean featuring Dexter Gordon recorded at the Jazzhus Montmartre in 1973 and released on the SteepleChase label.

Reception

The Allmusic review by Scott Yanow awarded the album 3 stars and stated "The music falls short of being classic but is quite spirited and recommended to fans of both Dexter Gordon and Jackie McLean".

Track listing
 Introduction by Jackie McLean - 0:50
 "All Clean" (Dexter Gordon) - 17:10
 "Rue de La Harpe" (Sahib Shihab) - 8:34
 "Callin'" (Kenny Drew) - 13:41 Bonus track on CD reissue
 "Sunset" (Drew) - 10:37 		
 "On the Trail" (Ferde Grofé) - 13:13

Personnel
Jackie McLean – alto saxophone
Dexter Gordon – tenor saxophone
Kenny Drew – piano
Niels-Henning Ørsted Pedersen – bass
Alex Riel – drums

References

SteepleChase Records live albums
Jackie McLean live albums
Dexter Gordon live albums
1974 live albums